The 2018 Utah Senate election was held on November 6, 2018. Fourteen Senate seats were up for election. Prior to the election, the Republicans held a majority.

Overview

Close races

Results
The election took place on November 6, 2018. Candidate list and results from the Lieutenant Governor of Utah.

See also
Utah Senate
Utah Legislature
Utah elections, 2018

References

State Senate
Utah State Senate elections
Utah Senate